Marilyn Jean Kelly (born April 15, 1938) is a retired jurist in Michigan. She was elected to two terms both on the Michigan Court of Appeals and as a justice of the Michigan Supreme Court. Due to her being over 70 years old, Kelly was prohibited by the Michigan Constitution to seek re-election in 2012.

Following Clifford Taylor's defeat in the 2008 elections, Justice Kelly was elected 4-3 to succeed him as Chief Justice of Michigan.  She held that position until 2011 when Robert P. Young, Jr. was elected by the justices of the court.

Biography

Kelly is a Detroit native and 1956 graduate of Mackenzie High School. In late 1956, Marilyn Jean Kelly moved to Ypsilanti to begin undergraduate coursework at Eastern Michigan University; she received her B.A. degree from E.M.U. in 1960. One year later, Kelly was awarded an M.A. degree in French Language and Literature from Middlebury College in Vermont. Following a brief stay in France, wrapping up her graduate studies at La Sorbonne - the University of Paris, Kelly spent five years teaching French in the Grosse Pointe public school system, Albion College and Eastern Michigan University.

Law career

Marilyn Jean Kelly also served on the Michigan State Board of Education during the 1960s; later elected as President of the statewide organization. In 1971, Marilyn Jean Kelly graduated with honors from the Wayne State University Law School. For the next seventeen years, Kelly clerked and practiced law as an associate attorney; eventually opening her own practice - Marilyn Kelly and Associates, of Bloomfield Hills.

In 1988, Kelly was elected to the first of two consecutive terms on the Michigan Court of Appeals. In 1996, during her second term on the appellate court, Marilyn Jean Kelly won election to the Michigan Supreme Court. Justice Kelly won a landslide re-election to the high court in 2004; receiving over 2 million votes - nearly half a million more than the runner-up.

References

External links
Michigan Supreme Court Historical Society
Marilyn Jean Kelly

Justices of the Michigan Supreme Court
Michigan state court judges
Living people
1938 births
Eastern Michigan University alumni
Middlebury College alumni
Wayne State University Law School alumni
Eastern Michigan University faculty
University of Paris alumni
Lawyers from Detroit
20th-century American judges
21st-century American judges
20th-century American women judges
21st-century American women judges
Mackenzie High School (Michigan) alumni
American women academics
Chief Justices of the Michigan Supreme Court
Women chief justices of state supreme courts in the United States